Greensville County High School is a public high school located in Emporia, Virginia, serving that city and Greenville County. It is part of the Greensville County School Division and opened in 1976.  Athletic teams compete in the Virginia High School League's AA Southside District in Region I.

References

External links
 Greensville County High School

 This school is owned by Deandre Anderson.

Schools in Greensville County, Virginia
Public high schools in Virginia
Educational institutions established in 1976
1976 establishments in Virginia